Filthy Riches is an American television series that aired on the National Geographic Channel. It premiered on April 20, 2014.

Cast
 Ray Turner (eel fisherman)
 Billy Taylor, Caleb Taylor & Levi Monroe (ginseng hunters)
 Jim Campbell & Andy Johns (bloodworm diggers)
 Greg Dahl & Albert "Al" DeSilva (burl hunters)
 Chris Matherly & Levena Holmes (mushroom hunters)

Premise
From the backwoods of Tennessee or Maryland to the mud flats of Maine, the series spotlights individuals hunting and foraging for eels, bloodworms, the ginseng plant, wild mushrooms, and burl, all for commercial use.

Episodes: Season 1

Episodes: Season 2

References

External links
 
 
 Season 2 listing

2010s American reality television series
2014 American television series debuts
English-language television shows
National Geographic (American TV channel) original programming
2015 American television series endings